Paradise is the third studio album by Jamaican contemporary R&B singer Ruby Turner, released December 19, 1989 via Jive Records. It is her only album to date to chart on the Billboard 200, peaking at #194 in 1990. It also peaked at #39 on the Billboard R&B chart.

Three singles were released from the album: "It's Gonna Be Alright", "Paradise" and "It's a Cryin' Shame". "It's Gonna Be Alright" was the most successful single from the album, peaking at #1 on the Billboard R&B singles chart in 1990.

Track listing

Chart positions

Samples

References

External links
 
 

1989 albums
Jive Records albums
Ruby Turner albums